The 70th Cannes Film Festival took place from 17 to 28 May 2017, in Cannes, France. Spanish film director and screenwriter Pedro Almodóvar was the President of the Jury for the festival and Italian actress Monica Bellucci hosted the opening and closing ceremonies. Ismael's Ghosts, directed by French director Arnaud Desplechin, was the opening film for the festival.

The festival celebrated its 70th edition. In late March 2017, the official poster of the festival was revealed featuring Italian actress Claudia Cardinale. The actress responded, "'I am honoured and proud to be flying the flag for the 70th Festival de Cannes, and delighted with this choice of photo. It's the image I myself have of the Festival, of an event that illuminates everything around … Happy anniversary!"

The Palme d'Or was awarded to the Swedish film, The Square directed by Ruben Östlund, which also served as the closing night film of the festival.

Juries

Main competition
Pedro Almodóvar, Spanish film director and screenwriter, Jury President
Maren Ade, German film director
Fan Bingbing, Chinese actress
Park Chan-wook, South Korean film director
Jessica Chastain, American actress and producer
Agnès Jaoui, French actress and film director
Will Smith, American actor and producer
Paolo Sorrentino, Italian film director
Gabriel Yared, French-Lebanese composer

Un Certain Regard
Uma Thurman, American actress, Jury President
Mohamed Diab, Egyptian film director
Reda Kateb, French actor
Joachim Lafosse, Belgian film director
Karel Och, Czech artistic director of Karlovy Vary International Film Festival

Caméra d'or
Sandrine Kiberlain, French actress, Jury President
Patrick Blossier, French cinematographer
Elodie Bouchez, French actress
Guillaume Brac, French film director
Thibault Carterot, French president of M141 Productions
Fabien Gaffez, French film critic
Michel Merkt, Swiss film producer

Cinéfondation and short films
Cristian Mungiu, Romanian film director, Jury President
Clotilde Hesme, French actress
Barry Jenkins, American film director
Eric Khoo, Singaporean film director
Athina Rachel Tsangari, Greek film director

Independent juries
Nespresso Grand Prize (International Critics' Week)
Kleber Mendonça Filho, Brazilian film director, Jury President
Diana Bustamante Escobar, Colombian film producer and artistic director of FICCI
Eric Kohn, American film critic
Hania Mroué, Lebanese director of Metropolis Cinema
Niels Schneider, French-Canadian actor

L'Œil d'or
Sandrine Bonnaire, French actress and film director, Jury President
Lorenzo Codelli, Italian film critic
Dror Moreh, Israeli film director
Thom Powers, American programmer and festival director
Lucy Walker, British film director

Queer Palm
Travis Mathews, American film director, Jury President
Yair Hochner, Israeli film director, founder and artistic director of TLVFest
Paz Lazaro, Spanish film programmer
Lidia Leber Terki, French film director
Didier Roth-Bettoni, French journalist and film historian

Official selection

In competition
The films competing in the main competition section for the Palme d'Or were announced at a press conference on 13 April 2017: The Palme d'Or winner has been highlighted.

(QP) indicates film eligible for the Queer Palm.

Un Certain Regard
The films competing in the Un Certain Regard section were announced at a press conference on 13 April 2017. Barbara, directed by Mathieu Amalric, was announced as the opening film for the Un Certain Regard section. The Un Certain Regard Prize winner has been highlighted.

(CdO) indicates film eligible for the Caméra d'Or as directorial debut feature.

Out of competition
The following films were selected to be screened out of competition:

(ŒdO) indicates film eligible for the Œil d'or as documentary.

Special screenings

(CdO) indicates film eligible for the Caméra d'Or as directorial debut feature. - (ŒdO) film eligible for the Œil d'or as documentary. - (QP) film eligible for the Queer Palm.

Virtual reality

70th anniversary events

Cinéfondation
The Cinéfondation section focuses on films made by students at film schools. The following 16 entries (14 fiction films and 2 animation films) were selected out of 2,600 submissions. Four of the films selected represent schools participating in Cinéfondation for the first time. The winner of the Cinéfondation First Prize has been highlighted.

Short films
Out of 4,843 entries, the following films were selected to compete for the Short Film Palme d'Or. The Short film Palme d'Or winner has been highlighted.

Cannes Classics
The full line-up for the Cannes Classics section was announced on 3 May 2017.

Restorations

Documentaries

(ŒdO) indicates film eligible for the Œil d'or as documentary.

Cinéma de la Plage
The Cinéma de la Plage is a part of the Official Selection of the festival. The outdoors screenings at the beach cinema of Cannes are open to the public.

Parallel sections

International Critics' Week
The full selection for the International Critics' Week section was announced on 21 April 2017, at the section's website. Sicilian Ghost Story, directed by Fabio Grassadonia and Antonio Piazza, was selected as the opening film for the International Critics' Week section, while Brigsby Bear, directed by Dave McCary, was selected as its closing film. The feature film competition included, for the first time in the section's history, an animated film and a documentary film.

Feature films - The winner of the Nespresso Grand Prize has been highlighted.

(CdO) indicates film eligible for the Caméra d'Or as directorial debut feature. - (ŒdO) film eligible for the Œil d'or as documentary.

Short films - The winner of the Discovery Award for Short Film has been highlighted.

(ŒdO) indicates film eligible for the Œil d'or as documentary.

Special screenings

(CdO) indicates film eligible for the Caméra d'Or as directorial debut feature.

Directors' Fortnight
The full selection for the Directors' Fortnight section was announced on 20 April 2017, at the section's website. Let the Sunshine In, directed by Claire Denis, was selected as the opening film for the Directors' Fortnight section and Patti Cake$, directed by Geremy Jasper, was selected as the closing film for the Directors' Fortnight section.

Feature films - The winner of the Art Cinema Award has been highlighted.

(CdO) indicates film eligible for the Caméra d'Or as directorial debut feature. - (ŒdO) film eligible for the Œil d'or as documentary. - (QP) film eligible for the Queer Palm.

Special screenings

Short films - The winner of the Illy Prize for Short Film has been highlighted.

(ŒdO) indicates film eligible for the Œil d'or as documentary.

ACID
ACID, an association of French and foreign film directors, demonstrates its support for nine films each year, seeking to provide support from filmmakers to other filmmakers. The full ACID selection was announced on 21 April 2017, at the section's website.

Feature films

(QP) indicates film eligible for the Queer Palm.

Special screenings

ACID Trip #1 - Serbia

Awards

Official awards
In Competition
 Palme d'Or: The Square by Ruben Östlund
 Grand Prix: BPM (Beats per Minute) by Robin Campillo
 Best Director: Sofia Coppola for The Beguiled
 Best Actor: Joaquin Phoenix for You Were Never Really Here
 Best Actress: Diane Kruger for In the Fade
 Jury Prize: Loveless by Andrey Zvyagintsev
 Best Screenplay:
 Yorgos Lanthimos and Efthymis Filippou for The Killing of a Sacred Deer 
 Lynne Ramsay for You Were Never Really Here
 70th Anniversary Prize: Nicole Kidman
 Honorary Palme d'Or: Jeffrey Katzenberg

Un Certain Regard
Un Certain Regard Award: A Man of Integrity by Mohammad Rasoulof
Un Certain Regard Jury Prize: April's Daughter by Michel Franco
Un Certain Regard Award for Best Director: Taylor Sheridan for Wind River
Un Certain Regard Jury Award for Best Performance: Jasmine Trinca for Fortunata
The Poetry of Cinema Award: Barbara by Mathieu Amalric

Cinéfondation
 First Prize: Paul Is Here by Valentina Maurel
 Second Prize: Animal by Bahman and Bahram Ark
 Third Prize: Two Youths Died by Tommaso Usberti

Golden Camera
 Caméra d'Or: Montparnasse Bienvenue by Léonor Sérraille

Short Films
 Short Film Palme d'Or: A Gentle Night by Qiu Yang
 Special Mention: The Ceiling by Teppo Airaksinen

Independent awards
FIPRESCI Prizes
 BPM (Beats per Minute) by Robin Campillo (In Competition)
 Closeness by Kantemir Balagov (Un Certain Regard)
 The Nothing Factory by Pedro Pinho (Directors' Fortnight)

Ecumenical Jury
 Prize of the Ecumenical Jury: Radiance by Naomi Kawase

Awards in the frame of International Critics' Week
 Nespresso Grand Prize: Makala by Emmanuel Gras
 France 4 Visionary Award: Gabriel and the Mountain by Fellipe Gamarano Barbosa
 Leica Cine Discovery Prize for Short Film: Los Desheredados by Laura Ferrés
 Gan Foundation Support for Distribution Award: Gabriel and the Mountain by Fellipe Gamarano Barbosa
 SACD Award: Ava by Léa Mysius
 Canal+ Award: The Best Fireworks Ever by Aleksandra Terpińska

Awards in the frame of Directors' Fortnight
 Art Cinema Award: The Rider by Chloé Zhao
 SACD Award:
 Let the Sunshine In by Claire Denis
 Lover for a Day by Philippe Garrel
 Europa Cinemas Label Award: A Ciambra by Jonas Carpignano
 Illy Prize for Short Film: Back to Genoa City by Benoit Grimalt

L'Œil d'or Jury
 L'Œil d'or: Faces Places by Agnès Varda and JR
 Special Mention: Makala by Emmanuel Gras

Queer Palm Jury
 Queer Palm Award: BPM (Beats per Minute) by Robin Campillo
 Short Film Queer Palm: Islands by Yann Gonzalez

Palm Dog Jury
 Palm Dog Award: Einstein for The Meyerowitz Stories (New and Selected)
 Grand Jury Prize: Lupo for Ava
 Palm DogManitarian Award: Leslie Caron and her 17-year-old pet rescue dog Tchi Tchi

Prix François Chalais
 François Chalais Prize: BPM (Beats per Minute) by Robin Campillo

Vulcan Award of the Technical Artist
 Vulcan Award: Josefin Åsberg for The Square  (set decoration)

Cannes Soundtrack Award
Cannes Soundtrack Award: Oneohtrix Point Never for Good Time

Special awards
 Chopard Trophy: Anya Taylor-Joy and George MacKay
 Carrosse d'Or: Werner Herzog

References

External links
  

2017 film festivals
2017
May 2017 events in France
2017 in French cinema